Changi Depot is located in Changi near Koh Sek Lim Road, Singapore.

Changi Depot comprises a train yard, which can hold a capacity of 46 trains and has an area of 250,000 square metres. The depot is also used for train inspection for trains on the East West line. The depot was completed in late 1980s when the East West line was completed. The depot is beside the NEWater Visitor Centre and is near Expo MRT station.

The depot is located between Expo station and Tanah Merah station on the East West line and has 2 reception tracks: 2 tracks westbound towards Tanah Merah station.

The depot will be replaced by the East Coast Integrated Depot in 2025.

History
On 6 November 1983, the large part of the Changi Depot land was acquired for the MRT stabling yard. To construct the MRT depot, the Kampong Koh Sek Lim was cleared by December 1983, and residents had moved to Tampines and Bedok.

Incidents
On 18 May 2010, a Kawasaki Heavy Industries C151 train carriage was deliberately vandalised in the depot. Elaborate graffiti was drawn on the lower half of the carriage.

A Swiss national, Oliver Fricker was charged with three charges of trespassing into the depot on the early hours of 17 May and vandalising the train by spraying paint and damaging public property by cutting a wired fence into property belonging to the Land Transport Authority.  Another British national has also been named as being involved in the case. However, his whereabouts are unknown.

SMRT apologised for the security lapse on 8 June 2010. It reviewed the security measures in all depots together with the authorities. All personnel of the security companies, employed by SMRT, have been instructed to step up vigilance. The number of security personnel and patrols at each depot has been increased.

SMRT was fined S$50,000 for this incident.

Upgrading
In August 2012, plans were announced to replace the existing Changi Depot, which will be demolished. A new depot, East Coast Integrated Depot, will be built beside the current site. The depot will house the rolling stock of the East West, Downtown and Thomson–East Coast lines. The facility is an underground (66 tracks for DTL), at-grade (62 tracks for TEL) and elevated depot (72 tracks for EWL) spread over three levels for each line. In August 2014, it was announced the completion date will be in 2025.

References

1989 establishments in Singapore
Mass Rapid Transit (Singapore) depots
Tampines